Turkey has submitted films for the Academy Award for Best International Feature Film on a regular basis since 1989. Prior to that, they also sent a single film (Dry Summer) in the 1960s after it won the Golden Bear at the Berlin Film Festival. The Oscar is handed out annually by the United States Academy of Motion Picture Arts and Sciences to a feature-length motion picture produced outside the United States that contains primarily non-English dialogue. It was not created until the 1956 Academy Awards, in which a competitive Academy Award of Merit, known as the Best Foreign Language Film Award, was created for non-English speaking films, and has been given annually since.

Over the years, twenty-eight films have been submitted by Turkey for consideration in the Best Foreign Language Film category. Although their 2008 submission Three Monkeys made the nine-film shortlist, no Turkish film has ever achieved an Oscar nomination. Additionally, Switzerland sent two Turkish language films to the competition, including Yol in 1982 which was a fully Turkish production by a Turkish director that had to be smuggled into Switzerland for post-production due to political considerations, and Journey of Hope, a film about Turkish refugees made by a Swiss director in conjunction with European film companies. Journey of Hope was submitted in 1990 and won the 1991 Oscar representing Switzerland. Over the years, several other European countries have chosen films that were partially set in Turkey and featured large sections in Turkish including Austria (For a Moment, Freedom), France (Mustang), Germany (The Edge of Heaven) and Greece (A Touch of Spice).

Four directors have represented Turkey in the competition more than once: Tunç Başaran, Nuri Bilge Ceylan, Semih Kaplanoğlu and Yavuz Turgul.

Submissions
The Academy of Motion Picture Arts and Sciences has invited the film industries of various countries to submit their best film for the Academy Award for Best Foreign Language Film since 1956. The Foreign Language Film Award Committee oversees the process and reviews all the submitted films. Following this, they vote via secret ballot to determine the five nominees for the award. Below is a list of the films that have been submitted by Turkey for review by the Academy for the award by year and the respective Academy Awards ceremony.

See also
List of Academy Award winners and nominees for Best Foreign Language Film
List of Academy Award-winning foreign language films
Cinema of Turkey

Notes

References

External links
The Official Academy Awards Database
The Motion Picture Credits Database
IMDb Academy Awards Page

Turkey
Academy Award